Hunted is a Belgian-French-Irish survival thriller film directed by Vincent Paronnaud. The film stars Christian Bronchart, Lucie Debay, Ciaran O'Brien, Jean-Mathias Pondant and Kevin Van Doorslaer. The film premiered at the 2020 Fantasia Film Festival and released on Shudder on January 14, 2021.

Plot
What started as a flirtatious encounter at a bar turns into a life-or-death struggle as Eve (Lucie Debay) becomes the unknowing target of a misogynistic plot against her. Forced to flee as two men pursue her through the forest, she’s pushed to her extremes while fighting to survive in the wilderness—but survival isn’t enough for Eve. She will have revenge.

Cast
 Christian Bronchart as The foreman
 Lucie Debay as Eve
 Ciaran O'Brien as The Accomplice
 Jean-Mathias Pondant as The barman
 Kevin Van Doorslaer as Eve's Boss
 Gilles Vandeweerd as Husband
 Dianne Weller as Real Estate Agent
 Arieh Worthalter as The Handsome Man

References

External links
 
 

2020 films
2020 thriller films
French thriller films
Belgian thriller films
Irish thriller films
French survival films
Belgian survival films
Irish survival films
2020s survival films
2020s English-language films
2020s French films